Shin Hong-gi (born 4 May 1968) is a South Korean former professional footballer. He played as a left-back for Ulsan Hyundai Horang-i and Suwon Samsung Bluewings. He was also selected for the South Korea national football team for the 1994 FIFA World Cup, playing three World Cup matches.

Career statistics

Club

International 
Results list South Korea's goal tally first.

Honours
Ulsan Hyundai Horang-i
K League 1: 1996
Korean League Cup: 1995

Suwon Samsung Bluewings
 K League 1: 1998, 1999
 Korean League Cup: 1999, 1999+, 2000, 2001
 Korean Super Cup: 1999, 2000
 Asian Club Championship: 2000–01, 2001–02
 Asian Super Cup: 2001

Individual
K League 1 Best XI: 1992, 1999
AFC Asian All Stars: 1993

References

External links
 Shin Hong-gi at FIFA
 
 Shin Hong-gi at KFA 
 

1968 births
Living people
Association football defenders
South Korean footballers
South Korea international footballers
Ulsan Hyundai FC players
Suwon Samsung Bluewings players
K League 1 players
1994 FIFA World Cup players
1996 AFC Asian Cup players
People from Gimpo
Sportspeople from Gyeonggi Province